Eupithecia subregulosa is a moth in the family Geometridae. It is found in Saudi Arabia.

References

Moths described in 1990
subregulosa
Moths of Asia